Public Music is a 24-hour Kannada music channel presented by Public TV and Lahari Recording company. The channel went on air on 28 September 2014 and is based on Kannada culture. The piled up stock of Lahari Recording with every area of music is the main attraction.

See also
List of Kannada-language television channels
Television in India
Media in Karnataka
Media of India

External links
 Publictv.in, Official website
 Publicmusictv at Facebook
 Publicmusictv at Youtube

References 

Music television channels
Music organisations based in India
Television stations in Bangalore
2014 establishments in Karnataka
Television channels and stations established in 2014

Music television channels in India